Ned Burton (1850–1922) was an American stage and film actor of the silent era.

Selected filmography
 The Man of the Hour (1914)
 The Fat Man's Burden (1914)
 Hogan's Alley (1914)
 The Velvet Paw (1916)
Man's Woman (1917)
 The Danger Game (1918)
 Ruler of the Road (1918)
 Thunderbolts of Fate (1919)
 Thou Shalt Not (1919)
 A Daughter of Two Worlds (1920)
 Tarnished Reputations (1920)

References

Bibliography
 Waldman, Harry. Maurice Tourneur: The Life and Films. McFarland, 2001.

External links

1850 births
1922 deaths
American male film actors
American male stage actors